Pillsburiaster is a genus of echinoderms belonging to the family Goniasteridae.

The genus has almost cosmopolitan distribution.

Species:

Pillsburiaster annandalei 
Pillsburiaster aoteanus 
Pillsburiaster calvus 
Pillsburiaster cuenoti 
Pillsburiaster döderleini 
Pillsburiaster ernesti 
Pillsburiaster geographicus 
Pillsburiaster indutilis 
Pillsburiaster indutilus 
Pillsburiaster investigatoris 
Pillsburiaster maini

References

Goniasteridae
Asteroidea genera